Min Thu may refer to:
 Min Thu (footballer)
 Min Thu (politician)